Shuko Aoyama and Renata Voráčová were the defending champions, but Voráčová chose not to participate. Aoyama partnered Makoto Ninomiya, but they lost in quarterfinals to Chuang Chia-jung and Liang Chen.
Chan Hao-ching and Chan Yung-jan won the title, defeating Misaki Doi and Kurumi Nara in the final, 6–1, 6–2.

Seeds

Draw

Draw

References
Main Draw

Japan Women's Open
2015 Japan Women's Open